Marten Luther Church can refer to:

Martin Luther Church (Halmstad), Sweden
Martin Luther Church (Paramaribo), Suriname
Martin Luther Cathedral, Daugavpils, Latvia